The Cincinnati Reds' 1989 season consisted of the Cincinnati Reds attempting to win the National League West for the first time since 1979. The season was defined by allegations of gambling by Pete Rose. Before the end of the season, Rose was banned from baseball by commissioner A. Bartlett Giamatti.

Offseason
November 5, 1988: Skeeter Barnes was signed as a free agent with the Cincinnati Reds.
 December 2, 1988: Rick Mahler signed as a free agent with the Cincinnati Reds.
 December 8, 1988: Rolando Roomes was traded by the Chicago Cubs to the Cincinnati Reds for Lloyd McClendon.
 December 21, 1988: Manny Trillo signed as a free agent with the Cincinnati Reds.
December 21, 1988: Joel Youngblood was signed as a free agent with the Cincinnati Reds.
 December 21, 1988: Ken Griffey, Sr. was released by the Cincinnati Reds.
March 28, 1989: Randy St. Claire was released by the Cincinnati Reds.
 March 30, 1989: Kent Tekulve signed as a free agent with the Cincinnati Reds.
 March 30, 1989: Ken Griffey, Sr. signed as a free agent with the Cincinnati Reds.

Ohio Cup

The first Ohio Cup, which was an annual pre-season baseball game was played in 1989. The single-game cup was played at Cooper Stadium in Columbus, Ohio, and was staged just days before the start of each new Major League Baseball season.

Regular season

Season standings

Record vs. opponents

Notable transactions
May 25, 1989: Manny Trillo was released by the Cincinnati Reds.
July 18, 1989: Tim Leary was traded by the Los Angeles Dodgers with Mariano Duncan to the Cincinnati Reds for Kal Daniels and Lenny Harris.

Notable games
On August 3, 1989, at Riverfront Stadium against the Houston Astros, the Reds set or tied several team, National League, and major league records by scoring 14 runs on 16 hits in the first inning. The bottom of the first inning lasted 38 minutes, and the first eight consecutive batters reached base. The Reds won the game 18-2.

Pete Rose: Permanent Ineligibility
Amid reports that he had bet on baseball, Rose was questioned in February 1989 by outgoing commissioner Peter Ueberroth and his replacement, Bart Giamatti. Rose denied the allegations and Ueberroth dropped the investigation.  However, after Giamatti became Commissioner, three days later, lawyer John Dowd was retained to investigate these charges against Rose.  A Sports Illustrated cover story published on March 21, 1989, gave the public their first detailed report of the allegations that Rose had placed bets on baseball games.

Dowd interviewed many of Rose's associates, including alleged bookies and bet runners.  He delivered a summary of his findings to the Commissioner in May, a document which became known as the Dowd Report.  In it, Dowd documented Rose's alleged gambling activities in 1985 and 1986 and compiled a day-by-day account of Rose's alleged betting on baseball games in 1987.  The Dowd Report documented his alleged bets on 52 Reds games in 1987, where Rose wagered a minimum of $10,000 a day. Others involved in the allegations claim that number was actually $2,000 a day.

According to the Dowd Report itself, "no evidence was discovered that Rose bet against the Reds." This is in contrast to the case of "Shoeless" Joe Jackson and his teammates in the Black Sox Scandal, who were accused of intentionally losing the 1919 World Series.

Rose continued to deny all of the accusations against him and refused to appear at a hearing with Giamatti on the matter. He filed a lawsuit alleging that the Commissioner had prejudged the case and could not provide a fair hearing.  A Cincinnati judge issued a temporary restraining order to delay the hearing, but Giamatti fought to have the case moved to Federal Court. The Commissioner prevailed in that effort, after which he and Rose entered settlement negotiations.

On August 24, 1989, Rose voluntarily accepted a permanent place on baseball's ineligible list. Rose accepted that there was a factual reason for the ban; in return, Major League Baseball agreed to make no formal finding with regard to the gambling allegations. According to baseball's rules, Rose could reapply for reinstatement. Rose, with a 412-373 record, was replaced as Reds manager by Tommy Helms. Rose began therapy with a psychiatrist for treatment of a gambling addiction.

Roster

Player stats

Batting
Note: Pos = Position; G = Games played; AB = At bats; H = Hits; Avg. = Batting average; HR = Home runs; RBI = Runs batted in

Other batters
Note: G = Games played, AB = At bats; H = Hits; Avg. = Batting average; HR = Home runs; RBI = Runs batted in

Starting pitchers 
Note: G = Games pitched; IP = Innings pitched; W = Wins; L = Losses; ERA = Earned run average; SO = Strikeouts

Other pitchers 
Note: G = Games pitched; IP = Innings pitched; W = Wins; L = Losses; ERA = Earned run average; SO = Strikeouts

Relief pitchers 
Note: G = Games Pitched; W = Wins; L = Losses; SV = Saves; ERA = Earned run average; SO = Strikeouts

Farm system

References

1989 Cincinnati Reds season at Baseball Reference

Cincinnati Reds Season, 1989
Cincinnati Reds seasons
Cinc